Harold Priestley Gill III (born April 6, 1975) is an American former professional ice hockey defenseman who played 16 NHL seasons with six different teams, winning the Stanley Cup with the Pittsburgh Penguins in 2009.

He also played for the Boston Bruins, Toronto Maple Leafs, Montreal Canadiens, Nashville Predators and Philadelphia Flyers. Gill was formerly manager of player development for the Florida Panthers.

He is currently co-host of Predators Live on Bally Sports with Lyndsay Rowley and a co-host with Darren McFarland on the Smashville Live radio broadcast.

Previously, Hal was the radio color commentator for the Predators on the Nashville Predators Radio Network.

Playing career
Before college, Gill was a notable quarterback at Nashoba Regional High School in Bolton, Massachusetts.

Gill was selected in the eighth round, 207th overall, by the Boston Bruins in the 1993 NHL Entry Draft. Following the draft, he spent four seasons at Providence College. The team won the 1996 Hockey East Men's Ice Hockey Tournament. Gill captained the 1997 team, recording a collegiate career-high 21 points in 35 games.

Gill made his NHL debut during the 1997–98 NHL season, skating in 68 games with the Bruins. He was a regular for the Bruins for the next six seasons. During the 2004–05 NHL lockout, Gill played for Lukko in the Finnish SM-liiga.

On July 1, 2006, the Toronto Maple Leafs signed Gill to a three-year contract, ending his tenure in Boston following nine seasons. He appeared in 145 games for the organization over two seasons.

On February 26, 2008, the Maple Leafs traded Gill to the Pittsburgh Penguins in exchange for a 2008 second-round pick and 2009 fifth-round pick. The team reached the Stanley Cup Finals, losing in six games to the Detroit Red Wings. The team reached the Stanley Cup Finals the following season, this time defeating the Red Wings to win the Stanley Cup.

On July 1, 2009, Gill signed a two-year, $4.5 million contract with the Montreal Canadiens. The club reached the Eastern Conference Finals, falling in five games to the Philadelphia Flyers. Gill was given credit for his performance in the first round against the Washington Capitals, as he defended extremely well against the Capitals’ biggest scorers. In the 2010 Stanley Cup playoffs, Gill recorded one assist and blocked 68 shots, helping the Canadiens pull off one of the biggest playoff upsets. On May 31, 2011, the Canadiens signed Gill to a one-year, $2.25 million contract extension.

On February 17, 2012, the Canadiens traded Gill (along with a 2013 conditional fifth-round pick) to the Nashville Predators in exchange for Blake Geoffrion, Robert Slaney and a 2012 second-round pick. On June 29, 2012, the Predators re-signed Gill to a two-year, $4 million contract extension. As the 2012–13 NHL lockout shortened the eventual season, Gill went scoreless in 30 games. On July 5, 2013, Gill's contract was bought out by the Predators after passing through unconditional waivers.

On September 7, 2013, the Philadelphia Flyers signed Gill to a professional try-out, allowing him to attend their training camp. On October 1, the team signed him to a one-year, $700,000 contract. Gill played in a mere six games for the Flyers, mainly serving as a healthy scratch.

On April 23, 2015, Gill announced his retirement from professional hockey following 16 seasons.

Post-playing career
On October 16, 2015, the Florida Panthers announced they had hired Gill as their manager of player development. He departed after one season.

On August 23, 2017, Gill joined 102.5 The Game and the Nashville Predators Radio Network as a radio color analyst.

Personal life
Gill grew up in Bolton, Massachusetts and attended Nashoba Regional High School. He is married to Anne and has three children.

Career statistics

Regular season and playoffs

International

See also
List of NHL players with 1000 games played

References

External links

 
National Hockey League Players' Associate bio

1975 births
American men's ice hockey defensemen
Boston Bruins draft picks
Boston Bruins players
Ice hockey players from Massachusetts
Living people
Lukko players
Montreal Canadiens players
Nashville Predators players
People from Bolton, Massachusetts
Philadelphia Flyers players
Pittsburgh Penguins players
Providence Bruins players
Providence Friars men's ice hockey players
Sportspeople from Worcester County, Massachusetts
Stanley Cup champions
Toronto Maple Leafs players